The Butler Rocks are two rock nunataks,  high, standing  southwest of Vanguard Nunatak in the northern Forrestal Range, Pensacola Mountains. They were mapped by the United States Geological Survey from surveys and from U.S. Navy air photos, 1956–66, and named by the Advisory Committee on Antarctic Names for William A. Butler, aerographer, Ellsworth Station winter party, 1957.

References 

Nunataks of Queen Elizabeth Land